Katrine Vejsgaard Veje (born 19 June 1991) is a Danish professional footballer who plays as a left back for Everton in the English FA Women's Super League and the Danish national team. She has previously played for Arsenal in the FA WSL, LdB FC Malmö of Sweden's Damallsvenskan, Seattle Reign FC of the National Women's Soccer League as well as Odense Q and Brøndby IF of Denmark's Elitedivisionen.

Club career
In 2007, Veje was awarded the Danish Football Association's prize for Young Player of the Year.

Seattle Reign
In January 2015, it was announced that Veje had signed with Seattle Reign FC for the third season of the National Women's Soccer League in the United States. Of her signing, Reign FC head coach Laura Harvey said, "I have had my eye on Katrine for many years, having first seen her when I was an assistant coach with the U17 England squad...We believe she is capable of bringing something special to our club and to the NWSL." She made her first appearance for Seattle on 12 July 2015 against Portland.

Brøndby IF
In October 2015, Veje decided to return to Brøndby IF. With Brøndby IF, she won the Danish league and cup in 2017.

Montpellier HSC
In June 2017, it was announced that Veje had signed a two-year contract with the Division 1 Féminine runners-up Montpellier HSC.

Arsenal
In January 2019, it was announced that Veje had signed a contract with Arsenal.

International career
Veje debuted on the Danish national team in a friendly against  England in 2009. She was named to national coach Kenneth Heiner-Møller's Denmark squad for UEFA Women's Euro 2013 as well as to Nils Nielsen's UEFA Women's Euro 2017 squad.

International goals

Honors and awards
LdB FC Malmö
 Damallsvenskan: 2011, 2013
 Swedish Super Cup: 2011, 2012

Seattle Reign FC
NWSL Shield: 2015

Brøndby IF
 Danish league: 2015, 2017
 Danish Women's Cup: 2015, 2017

Arsenal
FA Women's Super League: 2018-19

References

External links

 
 
 Denmark player profile
 
 

1991 births
Living people
Danish women's footballers
Denmark women's international footballers
Danish expatriate women's footballers
Expatriate women's footballers in Sweden
Expatriate women's footballers in France
FC Rosengård players
Damallsvenskan players
Brøndby IF (women) players
OL Reign players
National Women's Soccer League players
Expatriate women's soccer players in the United States
Vejle Boldklub players
People from Fredericia
Women's association football midfielders
Odense Q players
Danish expatriate sportspeople in the United States
Danish expatriate sportspeople in France
FIFA Century Club
Montpellier HSC (women) players
Division 1 Féminine players
Danish expatriate sportspeople in England
Danish expatriate sportspeople in Sweden
Arsenal W.F.C. players
Expatriate women's footballers in England
Women's Super League players
Sportspeople from the Region of Southern Denmark
UEFA Women's Euro 2022 players
UEFA Women's Euro 2017 players
Denmark international footballers
Association football midfielders